ICALP, the International Colloquium on Automata, Languages, and Programming is an academic conference organized annually by the European Association for Theoretical Computer Science and held in different locations around Europe. Like most theoretical computer science conferences its contributions are strongly peer-reviewed. The articles have appeared in proceedings published by Springer in their Lecture Notes in Computer Science, but beginning in 2016 they are instead published by the Leibniz International Proceedings in Informatics.

The ICALP conference series was established by Maurice Nivat, who organized the first ICALP in Paris, France in 1972. The second ICALP was held in 1974, and since 1976 ICALP has been an annual event, nowadays usually taking place in July.

Since 1999, the conference was thematically split into two tracks on "Algorithms, Complexity and Games" (Track A) and "Automata, Logic, Semantics, and Theory of Programming" (Track B), corresponding to the (at least until 2005) two main streams of the journal Theoretical Computer Science. Beginning with the 2005 conference, a third track (Track C) was added in order to allow deeper coverage of a particular topic. From 2005 until 2008, the third track was dedicated to "Security and Cryptography Foundations", and in 2009, it is devoted to the topic "Foundations of Networked Computation: Models, Algorithms and Information Management". Track C was dropped from the 2020 conference, with submissions from these areas invited to submit into Track A. Because of the COVID-19 pandemic, the 2020 conference was also unusual, taking place virtually for the first time (having been originally scheduled to take place in Beijing, China and later moved to Saarbrücken, Germany). ICALP 2021 took place virtually too.

Gödel Prize 

The Gödel Prize, a prize for outstanding papers in theoretical computer science and awarded jointly by the 
EATCS and the ACM SIGACT, is presented every second year at ICALP.
Presentation of the prize, which is awarded annually, alternates with the conference STOC (ACM Symposium on Theory of Computing).

See also 
 The list of computer science conferences contains other academic conferences in computer science.
 The topics of the conference cover the field of theoretical computer science.

References 

 International Colloquium on Automata, Languages and Programming (ICALP), on EATCS web site.
 .
 .
 .

External links 
 ICALP proceedings information from DBLP
 ICALP 2021, online, hosted in Glasgow, Scotland
 ICALP 2020, online, hosted in Saarbrücken, Germany
 ICALP 2019, Patras, Greece
 ICALP 2018, Prague, Czech Republic
 ICALP 2017, Warsaw, Poland
 ICALP 2016, Rome, Italy
 ICALP 2015, Kyoto, Japan
 ICALP 2014, Copenhagen, Denmark
 ICALP 2013, Riga, Latvia
 ICALP 2010, Bordeaux, France
 ICALP 2009 , Rhodes, Greece
 ICALP 2008, Reykjavík, Iceland
 ICALP 2007, Wrocław, Poland
 ICALP 2006 , Venice, Italy
 ICALP 2005, Lisbon, Portugal
 ICALP 2004, Turku, Finland
 ICALP 2003, Eindhoven, the Netherlands
 | ICALP 2002, Málaga, Spain
 ICALP 2001, Heraklion, Crete, Greece
 ICALP 2000, Geneva, Switzerland
 ICALP 1999, Prague, Czech Republic
 ICALP 1998, Aalborg, Denmark
 ICALP 1997, Bologna, Italy

Theoretical computer science conferences
Automata (computation)
Recurring events established in 1972